Ghatigaon (Devanagari: घाटीगांव Gháṭígaon) is a village and corresponding community development block in Gwalior district of Madhya Pradesh, India. As of 2011, the village population is 5,641, in 1,088 households.

History 
Ghatigaon is mentioned in the 1908 British gazetteer as a village of Gwalior State, in pargana Mastura of zila Gird Gwalior, with an area of 10,703 bighas and a population of 679. It had a camping ground, a Dak bungalow, an excise shop, metalled road access, a state post office, a railway station, and a sayar naka.

Villages 
Ghatigaon CD block has the following 159 villages:

References 

Villages in Gwalior district